Atikun Mheetuam (อติคุณ มีท้วม, born January 18, 1995) is a Thai professional footballer who plays as a defensive midfielder for Thai League 1 club Chiangrai United.

References

External links
 

1995 births
Living people
Atikun Mheetuam
Atikun Mheetuam
Association football midfielders
Atikun Mheetuam
Atikun Mheetuam